, Plants of the World Online accepted about 660 species in the genus Polygala.

A

Polygala abreui Marques & J.F.B.Pastore
Polygala abyssinica R.Br. ex Fresen.
Polygala acarnanica (Chodat) Kouharov & A.V.Petrova
Polygala acicularis Oliv.
Polygala adamsonii Exell
Polygala adenophora DC.
Polygala adenophylla A.St.-Hil. & Moq.
Polygala affinis DC.
Polygala afra Paiva
Polygala africana Chodat
Polygala alba Nutt.
Polygala albida Schinz
Polygala albowii Kem.-Nath.
Polygala alpestris Rchb.
Polygala alpicola Rupr.
Polygala alpina (DC.) Steud.
Polygala altomontana Lüdtke, Boldrini & Miotto
Polygala amara L.
Polygala amarella Crantz
Polygala amatymbica Eckl. & Zeyh.
Polygala ambigua Nutt.
Polygala amboniensis Gürke
Polygala amphothrix S.F.Blake
Polygala anatolica Boiss. & Heldr.
Polygala andensis Chodat
Polygala anderssonii B.L.Rob.
Polygala andringitrensis Paiva
Polygala angolensis Chodat
Polygala ankaratrensis H.Perrier
Polygala annectens S.F.Blake
Polygala antunesii Gürke
Polygala aparinoides Hook. & Arn.
Polygala aphylla A.W.Benn.
Polygala apiculata Huter, Porta & Rigo
Polygala apodanthera S.F.Blake
Polygala apparicioi Brade
Polygala appressa Benth.
Polygala appressipilis S.F.Blake
Polygala aquilonia (Fernald & B.G.Schub.) Sorrie & Weakley
Polygala arcuata Hayata
Polygala arenaria Willd.
Polygala arenicola Gürke
Polygala argentea Thulin
Polygala argentinensis Chodat
Polygala arillata Buch.-Ham. ex D.Don
Polygala arvensis Willd.
Polygala arvicola Bojer
Polygala asbestina Burch.
Polygala aschersoniana Chodat
Polygala aspalatha L.
Polygala asperuloides Kunth
Polygala atacorensis Jacq.-Fél.
Polygala atropurpurea A.St.-Hil. & Moq.
Polygala australis A.W.Benn.
Polygala azizsancarii Dönmez

B

Polygala baetica Willk.
Polygala baikiei Chodat
Polygala bakeriana Chodat
Polygala baldwinii Nutt.
Polygala barbata R.A.Kerrigan
Polygala barbellata S.K.Chen
Polygala bariensis Thulin
Polygala barklyensis R.A.Kerrigan
Polygala baumii Gürke
Polygala bawanglingensis F.W.Xing & Z.X.Li
Polygala berlandieri S.Watson
Polygala bevilacquae Marques
Polygala bifoliata R.A.Kerrigan
Polygala biformipilis S.F.Blake
Polygala birmanica Chodat
Polygala blakeana Steyerm.
Polygala bocainensis Brade
Polygala boissieri Coss.
Polygala bolbothrix Dunn
Polygala boliviensis A.W.Benn.
Polygala bomiensis S.K.Chen & J.Parn.
Polygala bonariensis Grondona
Polygala bowkerae Harv.
Polygala boykinii Nutt.
Polygala brachyanthema S.F.Blake
Polygala brachyptera Griseb.
Polygala brachysepala S.F.Blake
Polygala brachytropis S.F.Blake
Polygala bracteata A.W.Benn.
Polygala bracteolata L.
Polygala brandegeeana Chodat
Polygala brasiliensis L.
Polygala brevialata Chodat
Polygala brevifolia Nutt.
Polygala britteniana Chodat
Polygala bryoides A.St.-Hil. & Moq.
Polygala butyracea Heckel
Polygala buxiformis Hassk.

C

Polygala caerulescens S.F.Blake
Polygala calcarea F.W.Schultz
Polygala callispora Chodat
Polygala campestris Gardner
Polygala canaliculata R.A.Kerrigan
Polygala capillaris E.Mey. ex Harv.
Polygala cardiocarpa Kurz
Polygala carnosa Mukerjee
Polygala carnosicaulis W.H.Chen & Y.M.Shui
Polygala carphoides Chodat
Polygala caucasica Rupr.
Polygala caudata Rehder & E.H.Wilson
Polygala ceciliana Marques & J.F.B.Pastore
Polygala celosioides Mart. ex A.W.Benn.
Polygala chamaecyparis Chodat
Polygala chapadensis Chodat ex Grondona
Polygala chapmanii Torr. & A.Gray
Polygala chiapensis S.F.Blake
Polygala chinensis L.
Polygala cisandina Chodat
Polygala citrina Thulin
Polygala claessensii Chodat
Polygala clavistyla R.A.Kerrigan
Polygala cneorum A.St.-Hil. & Moq.
Polygala comosa Schkuhr
Polygala compacta Rose
Polygala compressa H.Perrier
Polygala conferta A.W.Benn.
Polygala conosperma Bojer
Polygala conzattii Rose
Polygala coralliformis R.A.Kerrigan
Polygala coriacea A.St.-Hil. & Moq.
Polygala coridifolia C.Presl
Polygala corifolia Triana & Planch.
Polygala corralitae Tombesi & R.Kiesling
Polygala crassitesta R.A.Kerrigan
Polygala crenata C.W.James
Polygala cretacea Kotov
Polygala crinita Chodat
Polygala crista-galli Chodat
Polygala cristata P.Taylor
Polygala crotalarioides Buch.-Ham. ex DC.
Polygala crucianelloides DC.
Polygala cruciata L.
Polygala curtissii A.Gray
Polygala cuspidata DC.
Polygala cuspidulata S.F.Blake
Polygala cymosa Walter
Polygala cyparissias A.St.-Hil. & Moq.

D

Polygala dasanensis Thulin
Polygala dasyphylla Levyns
Polygala decidua S.F.Blake
Polygala declinata (Harv.) Paiva
Polygala deflorata Chodat
Polygala densifolia A.St.-Hil. & Moq.
Polygala densiracemosa Lüdtke & Miotto
Polygala dependens R.A.Kerrigan
Polygala desiderata Speg.
Polygala dewevrei Exell
Polygala dhotarica Baker
Polygala didyma C.Y.Wu
Polygala difficilis R.A.Kerrigan
Polygala dimorphotricha R.A.Kerrigan
Polygala dispar Ghaz.
Polygala distans A.St.-Hil. & Moq.
Polygala doerfleri Hayek
Polygala dolichocarpa S.F.Blake
Polygala duarteana A.St.-Hil. & Moq.
Polygala dunniana H.Lév.

E

Polygala edmundii Chodat
Polygala effusa Paiva & Thulin
Polygala ehlersii Gürke
Polygala elegans Royle
Polygala eminensis Baker
Polygala engleri Chodat
Polygala engleriana Buscal. & Muschl.
Polygala ephedroides Burch.
Polygala equisetoides A.St.-Hil. & Moq.
Polygala ericifolia DC.
Polygala eriocephala F.Muell. ex Benth.
Polygala erioptera DC.
Polygala erlangeri Gürke ex Chodat
Polygala erubescens E.Mey. ex Chodat
Polygala evolvulacea Barneby
Polygala exelliana Troupin
Polygala exilis DC.
Polygala exserta S.F.Blake
Polygala exsquarrosa Adema

F

Polygala fallax Hemsl.
Polygala fendleri Chodat
Polygala fernandesiana Paiva
Polygala filicaulis Baill.
Polygala flavescens DC.
Polygala fontellana Marques & A.C.A.Aguiar
Polygala forojulensis A.Kern.
Polygala fragilis Paiva
Polygala franchetii Chodat
Polygala francisci Exell
Polygala fruticosa P.J.Bergius
Polygala furcata Royle

G

Polygala gabrielae Domin
Polygala galapageia Hook.f.
Polygala galeocephala R.A.Kerrigan
Polygala galeottii Chodat
Polygala galioides Poir.
Polygala ganguelensis Exell & Mendonça
Polygala garcini DC.
Polygala gawenensis Thulin
Polygala gayi A.W.Benn.
Polygala gazensis Baker f.
Polygala geniculata R.A.Kerrigan
Polygala gerrardii Chodat
Polygala gilletiana E.Petit
Polygala gillettii Paiva
Polygala glaucifolia R.A.Kerrigan
Polygala glaucoides L.
Polygala glaziowii Chodat
Polygala globulifera Dunn
Polygala glochidiata Kunth
Polygala gnidioides Willd.
Polygala goetzei Gürke
Polygala gomesiana Welw. ex Oliv.
Polygala gondarensis Chiov.
Polygala gossweileri Exell & Mendonça
Polygala goudahensis Paiva
Polygala gracilenta Burtt Davy
Polygala gracilipes Harv.
Polygala gracillima S.Watson
Polygala grandidieri Baill.
Polygala grazielae Marques
Polygala greveana Baill.
Polygala grossheimii Kem.-Nath.
Polygala guaranitica Chodat
Polygala guerichiana Engl.
Polygala guineensis Willd.
Polygala guneri Yild.
Polygala gymnoclada MacOwan
Polygala gypsophila Thulin

H

Polygala hainanensis Chun & F.C.How
Polygala hamarensis Thulin & Raimondo
Polygala harleyi Marques
Polygala hecatantha Urb.
Polygala helenae Greuter
Polygala hemipterocarpa A.Gray
Polygala herbiola A.St.-Hil. & Moq.
Polygala heterantha H.Perrier
Polygala hickeniana Grondona
Polygala hieronymi Chodat
Polygala hildebrandtii Baill.
Polygala hintonii S.F.Blake
Polygala hirsutula Arn.
Polygala hispida Burch. ex DC.
Polygala hohenackeriana Fisch. & C.A.Mey.
Polygala homblei Exell
Polygala hongkongensis Hemsl.
Polygala hookeri Torr. & A.Gray
Polygala hottentotta C.Presl
Polygala houtboshiana Chodat
Polygala huillensis Welw. ex Oliv.
Polygala humbertii H.Perrier
Polygala humifusa Paiva
Polygala hygrophila Kunth

I

Polygala illepida E.Mey. ex Harv.
Polygala × ilseana Graebn.
Polygala inaequiloba Turcz.
Polygala incarnata L.
Polygala inexpectata Pesmen & Erik
Polygala integra R.A.Kerrigan
Polygala irregularis Boiss.
Polygala irwinii Wurdack
Polygala isaloensis H.Perrier
Polygala isingii Pedley
Polygala isocarpa Chodat

J–K

Polygala jacobii Chandrab.
Polygala jamaicensis Chodat
Polygala japonica Houtt.
Polygala javana DC.
Polygala jefensis W.H.Lewis
Polygala judithea J.F.B.Pastore
Polygala jujuyensis Grondona
Polygala juncea A.St.-Hil. & Moq.
Polygala kajii Paiva
Polygala kalaboensis Paiva
Polygala kalaxariensis Schinz
Polygala kalunga J.F.B.Pastore
Polygala karensium Kurz
Polygala kasikensis Exell
Polygala khasiana Hassk.
Polygala kilimandjarica Chodat
Polygala kimberleyensis R.A.Kerrigan
Polygala koi Merr.
Polygala × kotovii Val.N.Tikhom.
Polygala kradungensis H.Koyama
Polygala krumanina Burch. ex Ficalho & Hiern
Polygala kurdica C.C.Towns.
Polygala kuriensis A.G.Mill.
Polygala kurtzii A.W.Benn.
Polygala kyoukmyoungensis Mukerjee

L

Polygala labatii Wahlert, G.E.Schatz & Phillipson
Polygala lactiflora Paiva & Brummitt
Polygala lancifolia A.St.-Hil. & Moq.
Polygala langebergensis Levyns
Polygala lasiosepala Levyns
Polygala latistyla Pendry
Polygala latouchei Franch.
Polygala laxifolia Exell
Polygala lecardii Chodat
Polygala leendertziae Burtt Davy
Polygala lehmanniana Eckl. & Zeyh.
Polygala leptophylla Burch.
Polygala leptosperma Chodat
Polygala leptostachys Shuttlew. ex A.Gray
Polygala leucantha A.W.Benn.
Polygala leucothyrsa Woronow
Polygala levynsiana Paiva
Polygala lewtonii Small
Polygala lhunzeensis C.Y.Wu & S.K.Chen
Polygala lijiangensis C.Y.Wu & S.K.Chen
Polygala limae Exell
Polygala linoides Poir.
Polygala loanzensis Exell
Polygala longeracemosa H.Perrier
Polygala longicaulis Kunth
Polygala longifolia Poir.
Polygala longiloba S.F.Blake
Polygala longipes S.F.Blake
Polygala lozanii Rose
Polygala ludwigiana Eckl. & Zeyh.
Polygala luenensis Paiva
Polygala lusitanica Welw. ex Chodat
Polygala lutea L.
Polygala luteoviridis Chodat
Polygala lycopodioides Chodat
Polygala lysimachiifolia Chodat

M

Polygala macowaniana Paiva
Polygala macrobotrya Domin
Polygala macrolophos Hassk.
Polygala macroptera DC.
Polygala macrostigma Chodat
Polygala magdalenae Brandegee
Polygala major Jacq.
Polygala makaschwilii Kem.-Nath.
Polygala malesiana Adema
Polygala malmeana Chodat
Polygala mandonii Chodat
Polygala mandrarensis Phillipson & G.E.Schatz
Polygala marensis Burtt Davy
Polygala mariamae Tamamsch.
Polygala mariana Mill.
Polygala mascatensis Boiss.
Polygala mathusiana Chodat
Polygala matogrossensis J.F.B.Pastore
Polygala mcvaughii T.Wendt
Polygala melilotoides Chodat
Polygala membranacea (Miq.) Görts
Polygala mendoncae E.Petit
Polygala meonantha Chodat
Polygala meridionalis Levyns
Polygala messambuziensis Paiva
Polygala mexicana Moc. ex Cav.
Polygala microlopha Burch. ex DC.
Polygala microphylla L.
Polygala microspora S.F.Blake
Polygala microtricha S.F.Blake
Polygala millspaughiana Paiva
Polygala minarum J.F.B.Pastore
Polygala minuta Paiva
Polygala misella Bernardi
Polygala moggii Raffaelli, Mosti & Tardelli
Polygala molluginifolia A.St.-Hil. & Moq.
Polygala monosperma A.W.Benn.
Polygala monspeliaca L.
Polygala mooneyi M.G.Gilbert
Polygala moquiniana A.St.-Hil. & Moq.
Polygala mossamedensis Paiva
Polygala mossii Exell
Polygala multicaulis Tausch
Polygala multiceps Mart. ex A.W.Benn.
Polygala multiflora Poir.
Polygala multifurcata Mildbr.
Polygala muratii Jacq.-Fél.
Polygala myriantha Chodat
Polygala myrtifolia L.
Polygala myrtillopsis Welw. ex Oliv.

N

Polygala nambalensis Gürke
Polygala nana DC.
Polygala nathadzeae A.I.Kuth.
Polygala nematocaulis Levyns
Polygala nematophylla Exell
Polygala nemoralis A.W.Benn.
Polygala neurocarpa Brandegee
Polygala nicaeensis Risso ex W.D.J.Koch
Polygala nikeliophila Marques & J.F.B.Pastore
Polygala nodiflora Chodat
Polygala northropiana R.N.Banerjee
Polygala nudicaulis A.W.Benn.
Polygala nuttallii Torr. & A.Gray
Polygala nyikensis Exell

O

Polygala oaxacana Chodat
Polygala obliqua Pendry
Polygala obovata A.St.-Hil. & Moq.
Polygala obtusissima Hochst. ex Chodat
Polygala obversa R.A.Kerrigan
Polygala oedipus Speg.
Polygala oedophylla S.F.Blake
Polygala ohlendorfiana Eckl. & Zeyh.
Polygala oligosperma C.Y.Wu
Polygala oliveriana Exell & Mendonça
Polygala omissa Bal.-Tul. & P.Herrera
Polygala oophylla S.F.Blake
Polygala ophiura Chodat
Polygala orbicularis Benth.
Polygala oreophila Speg.
Polygala oreotrephes B.L.Burtt

P–Q

Polygala padulae Arrigoni
Polygala pallida E.Mey. ex Harv.
Polygala paludicola Gürke
Polygala panamensis Chodat
Polygala paniculata L.
Polygala papilionacea Boiss.
Polygala pappeana Eckl. & Zeyh.
Polygala papuana (Steenis) Meijden
Polygala parkeri Levyns
Polygala parrasana Brandegee
Polygala parviloba R.A.Kerrigan
Polygala patagonica Phil.
Polygala patens J.F.B.Pastore & Marques
Polygala × pawlowskii Rothm.
Polygala pearcei A.W.Benn.
Polygala pedemontana E.P.Perrier & B.Verl.
Polygala pedicellata S.F.Blake
Polygala peduncularis Burch. ex DC.
Polygala pellucida Lace
Polygala pendulina R.A.Kerrigan
Polygala pennellii S.F.Blake
Polygala peplis Baill.
Polygala perdurans Pendry
Polygala perennis S.F.Blake
Polygala perrieri Paiva
Polygala persicariifolia DC.
Polygala persistens A.W.Benn.
Polygala peruviana A.W.Benn.
Polygala peshmenii Eren, Parolly, Raus & Kürschner
Polygala petitiana A.Rich.
Polygala petrophila R.A.Kerrigan
Polygala phoenicistes S.F.Blake
Polygala plagioptera Linden & Planch.
Polygala platyptera Bornm. & Gauba
Polygala poaya Mart.
Polygala poggei Gürke
Polygala polifolia C.Presl
Polygala polyedra Brandegee
Polygala polygama Walter
Polygala pottebergensis Levyns
Polygala praecox R.A.Kerrigan
Polygala praetermissa Thulin
Polygala praticola Chodat
Polygala preslii Spreng.
Polygala producta N.E.Br.
Polygala pruinosa Boiss.
Polygala pseudoalpestris (Gren.) Dalla Torre & Sarnth.
Polygala pseudocoelosioides Chodat
Polygala pseudocoriacea Chodat
Polygala pseudoerica A.St.-Hil. & Moq.
Polygala pseudogarcini Chodat
Polygala pseudohospita (Tamamsch.) Tamamsch.
Polygala pseudovariabilis Chodat
Polygala pterocarpa R.A.Kerrigan
Polygala pterocarya Chodat
Polygala pteropoda H.Perrier
Polygala pubiflora Burch. ex DC.
Polygala pulchella A.St.-Hil. & Moq.
Polygala pumila Norlind
Polygala punctata A.W.Benn.
Polygala pungens Burch.
Polygala pycnantha R.A.Kerrigan
Polygala pyroloides Gagnep.
Polygala quitensis Turcz.

R

Polygala raddiana A.St.-Hil. & Moq.
Polygala ramosa Elliott
Polygala rarifolia DC.
Polygala rausiana U.Raabe, Kit Tan, Iatroú, Vold & Parolly
Polygala recognita Chodat
Polygala refracta Burch. ex DC.
Polygala regnellii Chodat
Polygala rehmannii Chodat
Polygala reinii Franch. & Sav.
Polygala remota A.W.Benn.
Polygala resedoides A.St.-Hil.
Polygala resendeana Paiva
Polygala resinosa S.K.Chen
Polygala retamoides (H.Perrier) Wahlert, Phillipson & G.E.Schatz
Polygala retiefiana Paiva & Figueiredo
Polygala retifolia S.F.Blake
Polygala revoluta Gardner
Polygala rhinanthoides Sol. ex Benth.
Polygala rhinostigma Chodat
Polygala rhynchocarpa R.A.Kerrigan
Polygala rhynchosperma S.F.Blake
Polygala rhysocarpa S.F.Blake
Polygala rigens Burch.
Polygala rigida A.St.-Hil. & Moq.
Polygala riograndensis Lüdtke & Miotto
Polygala rivularis Gürke
Polygala robsonii Exell
Polygala robusta Gürke
Polygala rodrigueana Paiva
Polygala rojasii Chodat
Polygala rosea Desf.
Polygala rosei Hicken
Polygala rosmarinifolia Wight & Arn.
Polygala rossica Kem.-Nath.
Polygala rostrata Chodat
Polygala roubienna A.St.-Hil. & Moq.
Polygala rugelii Shuttlew. ex A.Gray
Polygala rupestris Pourr.
Polygala rupicola Hochst. & Steud. ex A.Rich.
Polygala russelliana S.F.Blake
Polygala ruwenzoriensis Chodat

S

Polygala sabuletorum Skottsb.
Polygala saccopetala R.A.Kerrigan
Polygala sadebeckiana Gürke
Polygala saginoides Griseb.
Polygala salasiana Gay
Polygala salviniana A.W.Benn.
Polygala sanariapoana Steyerm.
Polygala sancti-georgii L.Riley
Polygala sanguinea L.
Polygala sansibarensis Gürke
Polygala santacruzensis Grondona
Polygala santanderensis Killip & Steyerm.
Polygala saprophytica Chodat ex Grondona
Polygala sardoa Chodat
Polygala savannarum Chodat
Polygala saxicola Dunn
Polygala schinziana Chodat
Polygala schirvanica Grossh.
Polygala schoenlankii O.Hoffm. & Hildebr.
Polygala schweinfurthii Chodat
Polygala scoparia Kunth
Polygala scoparioides Chodat
Polygala scorpioides R.A.Kerrigan
Polygala sedoides A.W.Benn.
Polygala sekhukhuniensis Retief, S.J.Siebert & A.E.van Wyk
Polygala selaginoides A.W.Benn.
Polygala seleri Chodat
Polygala sellowiana A.St.-Hil. & Moq.
Polygala semialata S.Watson
Polygala seminuda Harv.
Polygala senega L.
Polygala senensis Klotzsch
Polygala septentrionalis Troupin
Polygala sericea A.W.Benn.
Polygala serpentaria Eckl. & Zeyh.
Polygala serpyllifolia Hosé
Polygala setacea Michx.
Polygala sfikasiana Kit Tan
Polygala shinnersii W.H.Lewis
Polygala sibirica L.
Polygala sinaica Botsch.
Polygala sinaloae S.F.Blake
Polygala sincorensis Chodat
Polygala sinisica Arrigoni
Polygala sipapoana Wurdack
Polygala × skrivanekii Podp.
Polygala smallii R.R.Sm. & D.B.Ward
Polygala solieri Gay
Polygala somaliensis Baker
Polygala sophiae Kem.-Nath.
Polygala sosnowskyi Kem.-Nath.
Polygala sparsiflora Oliv.
Polygala spathulata Griseb.
Polygala sphaerocephala Chodat
Polygala sphenoptera Fresen.
Polygala spicata Chodat
Polygala spinescens Gillies ex Hook. & Arn.
Polygala spruceana A.W.Benn.
Polygala squamifolia C.Wright ex Griseb.
Polygala stenocarpa S.F.Blake
Polygala stenoclada Benth.
Polygala stenopetala Klotzsch
Polygala stenophylla A.Gray
Polygala stenosepala (Benth.) R.A.Kerrigan
Polygala stephaniana Marques
Polygala steudneri Chodat
Polygala stocksiana Boiss.
Polygala stricta A.St.-Hil. & Moq.
Polygala suanica Tamamsch.
Polygala subalata S.Watson
Polygala subandina Phil.
Polygala subdioica H.Perrier
Polygala subopposita S.K.Chen
Polygala subtilis Kunth
Polygala subuniflora Boiss. & Heldr.
Polygala subverticillata Chodat
Polygala succulenta R.A.Kerrigan
Polygala suganumae J.F.B.Pastore & Marques
Polygala sumatrana Miq.
Polygala supina Schreb.

T

Polygala tacianae J.F.B.Pastore & Harley
Polygala tamamschaniae V.I.Dorof.
Polygala tamariscea Mart. ex A.W.Benn.
Polygala tatarinowii Regel
Polygala telephium Chodat
Polygala tellezii T.Wendt
Polygala tenella Willd.
Polygala tenuicaulis Hook.f.
Polygala tenuifolia Willd.
Polygala tenuis DC.
Polygala tenuissima Chodat
Polygala tepperi F.Muell.
Polygala teretifolia L.f.
Polygala thunbergii DC.
Polygala timoutoides Chodat
Polygala timoutou Aubl.
Polygala tinctoria Vahl
Polygala tisserantii Jacq.-Fél.
Polygala tonkinensis Chodat
Polygala torrei Exell
Polygala transcaucasica Tamamsch.
Polygala transvaalensis Chodat
Polygala tricholopha Chodat
Polygala trichoptera Chodat
Polygala trichosperma Jacq.
Polygala triflora L.
Polygala trifurcata Chodat
Polygala triquetra C.Presl
Polygala tuberculata Chodat
Polygala turcica Dönmez & Ugurlu
Polygala turgida Rose

U–V

Polygala umbellata L.
Polygala umbonata Craib
Polygala uncinata E.Mey. ex Meisn.
Polygala urartu Tamamsch.
Polygala usafuensis Gürke
Polygala validiflora R.A.Kerrigan
Polygala veadeiroensis J.F.B.Pastore
Polygala velata S.F.Blake
Polygala venenosa Juss. ex Poir.
Polygala ventanensis Grondona
Polygala venulosa Sm.
Polygala vergrandis W.H.Lewis
Polygala verticillata L.
Polygala vilcabambae B.Eriksen & B.Ståhl
Polygala virgata Thunb.
Polygala viridis S.Watson
Polygala vittata Paiva
Polygala vollii Brade
Polygala vulgaris L.

W–Z

Polygala watsonii Chodat
Polygala wattersii Hance
Polygala weberbaueri Chodat
Polygala welwitschii Chodat
Polygala wenxianensis Y.S.Zhou & Z.X.Peng
Polygala westii Exell
Polygala wettsteinii Chodat
Polygala wightiana Wall. ex Wight & Arn.
Polygala williamsii Böcher, Hjert. & Rahn
Polygala wilmsii Chodat
Polygala wilsonii Small
Polygala wittebergensis Compton
Polygala wittei Exell
Polygala woodii Chodat
Polygala wurdackiana W.H.Lewis
Polygala wuzhishanensis S.K.Chen & J.Parn.
Polygala xanthina Chodat
Polygala xanti A.Gray
Polygala yemenica Chodat
Polygala youngii Exell
Polygala zambesiaca Paiva

References

Polygala